HD 99109 b is an extrasolar planet approximately 197 light-years away in the constellation of Leo.  The planet was confirmed in 2006 to be orbiting the orange dwarf star HD 99109.  The planet is about one half the mass of Jupiter, classifying the planet as a Jovian planet. The orbital eccentricity is about the same as Mars.

The planet HD 99109 b is named Perwana. The name was selected in the NameExoWorlds campaign by Pakistan, during the 100th anniversary of the IAU. Perwana means moth in Urdu, alluding to the eternal love of an object circling a source of light (name of HD 99109 is Shama or lamp).

References

External links 

 
 

Leo (constellation)
Exoplanets discovered in 2005
Giant planets
Giant planets in the habitable zone
Exoplanets detected by radial velocity
Exoplanets with proper names